Benedek Váradi (born 5 February 1995) is a Hungarian professional basketball player for Rytas Vilnius of the Lithuanian Basketball League.

Professional career
Váradi has been the team captain of his club Falco KC, which he led to the Championship of the 2018–19 Nemzeti Bajnokság I/A season. During the 2020-21 season, Váradi averaged 12.2 points and 5.4 assists per game. He re-signed with the team on 16 August 2021.

National team
Váradi has been a member of the Hungarian national basketball team.
At the EuroBasket 2022 qualification, Hungary surprisingly defeated defending Champion Slovenia 77-75. Váradi labelled the victory as "among the most important" in his career.

References

External links
Basketball Champions League profile 
Profile at RealGM.com
Profile at Eurobasket.com

1995 births
Living people
Guards (basketball)
Hungarian men's basketball players
Sportspeople from Szombathely